Brian Pavia Lentz (born 29 February 1968) is a Danish boxer. He competed in the men's middleweight event at the 1992 Summer Olympics.

References

External links
 

1968 births
Living people
Danish male boxers
Olympic boxers of Denmark
Boxers at the 1992 Summer Olympics
Sportspeople from Copenhagen
Middleweight boxers